Stowmarket is a market town in Suffolk, England, on the busy A14 trunk road between Bury St Edmunds to the west and Ipswich to the southeast. The town is on the main railway line between London and Norwich, and lies on the River Gipping, which is joined by its tributary, the River Rat, to the south of the town.

The town takes its name from the Old English word stōw meaning "principal place", and was granted a market charter in 1347 by Edward III. A bi-weekly market is still held there today on Thursday and Saturday.

The population of the town has increased from around 6,000 in 1981 to its current level of around 19,000, with considerable further development planned for the town and surrounding villages as part of an area action plan. It is the largest town in the Mid Suffolk district and is represented in parliament by the MP for Bury St Edmunds, currently Jo Churchill.

Historic events

Disaster struck Stowmarket on 11 August 1871, when an explosion at a local gun cotton factory claimed twenty-eight lives and left seventy five injured. The site of the explosion is now home to a large paint factory.

In 1909 Stowmarket High School was founded.

On the 8 June 1918 the first UK astronomical observation of nova V603 Aquilae was made from Stowmarket by A. Grace Cook. History repeated itself on 13 December 1934 when amateur astronomer J. P. M. Prentice discovered DQ Herculis from the town.

Just before midday on Friday 31 January 1941, a solitary German bomber plane (eyewitness accounts differ on the model) was spotted over Stowmarket firing its guns. The bomber strafed a large area of the town, before dropping bombs onto the high street. The Stowmarket Congregational Chapel, a gothic style building that was built in the 19th century, was completely destroyed. There was one casualty, Mrs Rhoda Farrow, who had just returned from seeing her son Ronald and his fiancée off at the railway station.

On 17 July 2002, Her Majesty Queen Elizabeth II and Prince Philip, Duke of Edinburgh, visited Stowmarket during the Golden Jubilee Celebrations. This was the Queen's second visit to Stowmarket, having first visited the town not long into her reign as Queen in July 1961. During the visit, Her Majesty and Prince Philip visited the local market, meeting stall holders before the Queen unveiled a new Town Sign and met representatives from local organisations while the Duke of Edinburgh met students who took part in The Duke of Edinburgh's Award and viewed a display at the Museum of East Anglian Life.

Landmarks

The church of St Peter and St Mary is in the Decorated style and dates to the 14th century. The 16th-century former vicarage, now the town council offices and register office, has associations with John Milton; Milton's Tree in its grounds is believed to be an offshoot of one of the many trees he planted there.

Haughley Park is an historical house situated in Haughley to the west of the town, of some significance, listed in the English Heritage Register. It is a large red brick country house built in about 1620 for the Sulyard family who were very prominent landowners in this area.

Opened in 1967, The Food Museum (formerly the Museum of East Anglian Life) occupies a  site close to the town centre.

The Karnser is a raised pavement in Station Road West, next to the church. The name is the East Anglian dialect word caunsey, meaning a causey (causeway).

Transportation

In the 18th century the Gipping was made navigable between Stowmarket and Ipswich by a series of locks. The newly created canal was known as the Ipswich and Stowmarket Navigation.

Stowmarket railway station, on the Great Eastern Main Line, is served by numerous train services operated by Greater Anglia: Peterbrough to Ipswich (via Ely, Bury St Edmunds and Stowmarket); Cambridge to Ipswich (via Newmarket, Bury St Edmunds, Stowmarket and Needham Market); and Norwich to London Liverpool Street (via Diss / Ipswich / Colchester / Chelmsford / Stratford).

Suffolk County Council has built a road from the Central Roundabout, a short distance to the east of Stowmarket, to Gipping Way in central Stowmarket at a cost of £21 million. The scheme was completed in summer 2010. The new road bridges the railway line and the River Gipping.

Governance

Stowmarket Town Council is the first tier of local government for Stowmarket. Formed in 1974 from the Stowmarket Urban District Council, the Town Council serves a population of approximately 20,000 people in four wards. It is made up of 16 elected members backed up by a staff of over 30. The council is located in the historic Milton House.

Stowmarket is also home to Babergh and Mid Suffolk District Council offices.

County Councillors

Sport and leisure

Stowmarket has a non-League football club Stowmarket Town F.C., which plays at Greens Meadow. There is also a rugby club located at Chilton Fields, to the north of the town. Stowmarket is home to a handful of gyms and also boasts its own leisure centre complete with swimming pools, climbing wall, bowls green, gym, and artificial-turf football pitch. The town has a plethora of grassroots clubs playing a multitude of sports.

The Regal Theatre Cinema has been in operation in the town centre for more than fifty years, offering films, concerts and theatre productions.

The former Corn Exchange underwent a £1 million refurbishment in 2012 to become a music venue, art gallery and theatre named the John Peel Centre for Creative Arts. It is named after the late influential DJ and broadcaster who lived just outside the town.

Climate
Stowmarket has a maritime climate type as is typical for the bulk of the British Isles. Wattisham is the nearest official weather station, about 4 miles south south west of Stowmarket Town centre.

The absolute maximum temperature recorded was  during the August 2003 heatwave.

In an average year, 48.3 air frosts can be expected.

Sunshine, averaging over 1635 hours a year, is amongst the highest for inland areas of Britain. Annual rainfall totals average below 575mm, with over 1mm of rain falling on 109.4 days. All averages refer to the observation period 1971–2000.

Stowmarket today
Stowmarket has held an annual carnival for well over 50 years in the recreation park featuring a fun fair, fireworks, a procession through the town and local entertainment.

Stowmarket also plays host to the music festival Stow-Fest, a live music open-air event that takes place annually at Chilton Fields in the North of Stowmarket. Since 2010 the town has hosted the Stowblues Festival, organised in partnership with BBC Radio Suffolk.

The Mix is located on Ipswich Street,  and is a flagship youth and community centre in Suffolk.

Notable residents
The poet John Milton made regular visits to the town as his tutor, Dr Thomas Young, became vicar of Stowmarket in 1628.

Other notable residents included political writer William Godwin, who spent time as minister at the Stowmarket Independent Church; and singer / West End actress, Kerry Ellis, who was brought up in the nearby village of Haughley and attended Stowmarket's High School. Delia Smith also resides nearby in Combs. Stow has produced professional footballers, James Scowcroft who played for the local junior sides and Ipswich Town among others. Professional wrestler Neil Faith has lived in Stowmarket. As well as poet George Crabbe, who went to school in the town. The amateur astronomers A. Grace Cook and J. P. M. Prentice lived in the town. Former MP Gareth Snell is from Stowmarket.
Murder victim Matthew Pyke grew up in this town.

See also
Stowmarket (Central) Ward
Stowmarket (North) Ward
Stowmarket (South) Ward
Stowmarket (UK Parliament constituency)
Stowmarket by-election, 1891
Stowmarket Guncotton Explosion
Stowmarket High School
Stowmarket railway station
Stowmarket Town Council
Stowmarket Town F.C.
Church of St Peter and St Mary, Stowmarket
Ipswich & Stowmarket Navigation

References

External links

 Stowmarket Town Council
 Stowmarket Area Guide
 Stowmarket History and Heritage
 Stowmarket Flyer (Local News – Printed Monthly and Online
 Stowmarket Sport (Grassroots coverage of sports, clubs and teams in a three-mile radius of Stowmarket)
 Stowmarket Church (St. Peter and St. Mary Stowmarket)

 
Market towns in Suffolk
Mid Suffolk District
Towns in Suffolk
Civil parishes in Suffolk